Streetsville GO Station is a GO Transit railway station on the Milton line in the Greater Toronto Area, Ontario, Canada. It is located in the community of Streetsville in Mississauga.

Like most GO stations, Streetsville offers parking for commuters, a bus loop, a station building housing ticket sales and a waiting room. There is limited external exposed shelter for bus passengers. A new lot with 135 additional spaces was constructed in 2015.

Although ridership on the Milton line has grown beyond GO's expectations, it is not possible to run more trains because the tracks are already busy with Canadian Pacific Railway freight traffic. In order to increase capacity, GO plans to extend the platforms to accommodate trains with twelve carriages rather than the current ten. As a temporary solution, extensive train-bus services help alleviate congestion.

Streetsville is one of several stations on the Milton Line, along with Dixie and Milton to offer facilities for mobility challenged passengers.

Connecting transit
MiWay peak period service only
9 Rathburn-Thomas

History

Streetsville Junction station

The Credit Valley Railway built the station in 1879, at the junction of the London and Orangeville branches of the railway, just north of Britannia Road about two kilometres from the current GO Transit facility. This station was located so far from the small village of Streetsville that passengers complained and the new "lower" station was built. The original building was purchased by Ephraim Evans in 1914 and moved to its current location at 78 William Street. It is designated under the terms of the Ontario Heritage Act.

Streetsville Lower station
This station was located at the end of Old Station Road in Streetsville, near the current GO Station site. When the "junction" station closed the Canadian Pacific Railway replaced the small frame building by a more substantial brick building. Passenger train service was discontinued in 1961 and the building was used as a freight office until its demolition in 1982.

References

External links

GO Transit railway stations
Galt Subdivision
Railway stations in Mississauga
Railway stations in Canada opened in 1981
1981 establishments in Ontario